Lord of Meirás was a hereditary title in the Peerage of Spain accompanied by the dignity of Grandee, granted in 1975 by Juan Carlos I to Carmen Polo y Martínez-Valdés, First Lady of Spain between 1939 and 1975 and wife of Francisco Franco. The title makes reference to the Pazo de Meirás, summer home of Franco in Galicia.

It was abolished in October 2022, under the purview of the Law of Democratic Memory.

Lords of Meirás (1975–2022)
 Carmen Polo y Martínez-Valdés, 1st Lady of Meirás (1975–1988)
 Francisco Franco y Martínez-Bordiú, 2nd Lord of Meirás (1989–2022)

See also
 Duke of Franco
 List of lords in the peerage of Spain

References

Meirás
Francoist Spain
Noble titles created in 1975
Grandees of Spain
1975 establishments in Spain
2022 disestablishments in Spain